Mariana Nicolau (born 16 November 1997) is a Brazilian rugby sevens player. She competed in the women's tournament at the 2020 Summer Olympics. She represented Brazil at the 2022 Rugby World Cup Sevens in Cape Town, they placed eleventh overall.

References

External links
 

1997 births
Living people
Female rugby sevens players
Olympic rugby sevens players of Brazil
Rugby sevens players at the 2020 Summer Olympics
People from São José dos Campos
Sportspeople from São Paulo (state)
Brazilian female rugby union players
Brazil international women's rugby sevens players
Brazilian rugby sevens players